Cape Farina is a headland in Bizerte Governorate, Tunisia. It forms the northwestern end of the Gulf of Tunis. The Tunisian towns of Ghar el-Melh (the ancient Castra Delia), Rafraf, Lahmeri, and the beach of Plage Sidi Ali Mekki Est are located along the peninsula.

Names

Its modern Arabic names are Ras et-Tarf or Ras Sidi Ali el-Mekki.

Geography
The extremity of Cape Farina forms the northwestern end of the Gulf of Tunis.

History
Under Roman rule, the peninsula preserved an ancient and important temple to "Apollo", probably representing a continuation of the Carthaginian worship of the healing god Eshmun. The settlement at Castra Delia (modern-day Ghar el-Melh), the largest on the peninsula, was also sometimes known by the peninsula's latinized Punic name as "Rusucmona".

Under Turkish rule, Porto Farina (modern-day Ghar el-Melh) was a well-fortified base for piracy. This caused it to be the scene of the 1655 English assault wherein naval bombardment completely overwhelmed shore defenses for the first time.

Gallery

References

Citations

Bibliography
 . 
 .

Farina